Freeman Woodcock Thorpe (or Thorp; June 16, 1844 – October 20, 1922), born in Geneva, Ohio, was an American painter who painted portraits of many notable people such as Abraham Lincoln, James Garfield, William McKinley, Grover Cleveland, Ulysses Grant, Simon Cameron, Salmon Chase, Robert Smith, Horace Greeley, Walter Forward and Robert E. Lee. He was also a state legislator in Ohio and a soldier.

Biography

Early life
Freeman Thorpe was born in Geneva, Ohio in 1844 to Clarissa Thorpe. His father may have been Dennis Thorpe, the first mayor of Geneva, though it has also been suggested that his father was Squire Thorpe, a local justice of the peace. He apparently began practicing his skills with art from an early age. At the age of 16 or 17, Thorpe first encountered Abraham Lincoln as his inaugural train traveled through Geneva on February 15, 1861. This is said to be when Thorpe created his first sketch of Lincoln.

When the American Civil War broke out in 1861, Thorpe enlisted with the 2nd Ohio Cavalry Regiment, serving as a scout in southern Missouri. He is also said to have carried a missive from camp in Tennessee to Secretary of War Edwin Stanton. As a reward, Stanton arranged for Thorpe to be placed close to Lincoln as he gave his address at Gettysburg, Pennsylvania on November 19, 1863. He also sketched the President on this occasion.

Artwork
Following the war, Thorpe trained as a photographer under the instruction of his sister, Ruby M. Thorpe, and also began teaching himself to paint portraits. He left Ruby's studio in 1869 or 1870 to open his own photography studio in Bucyrus, Ohio. Through the 1870s, he gained popularity, especially among politicians in Washington, D.C. Ulysses S. Grant, who Thorpe had met during the Civil War, helped to arrange for him to have a studio space above the Senate wing in the United States Capitol. Between his Capitol studio, his studio in Geneva, and travel around the country, Thorpe is estimated to have created roughly 600 works. His subjects included presidents, governors, Congressmen, Cabinet members, generals, and other well-known figures of his day.

Later life and death
In addition to his artistic endeavors, Thorpe was elected to the Ohio House of Representatives in 1878, a position he held for four terms. He also served as a commander of the Ohio National Guard until 1885, and achieved the rank of colonel through his service.

In the 1890s, he moved to Crow Wing County, Minnesota due to ill health, and began to farm trees on his land there. He also continued painting until his death. Arguably his most well-known work, a portrait of Abraham Lincoln, was commissioned by the United States Senate in 1920, and the painting hangs in the United States Capitol today.

Thorpe died in Crow Wing County on October 20, 1922, at the age of 78.

Marriage and children

Freeman Thorpe married Orlena Eggleston (1847-1919) in Geneva, Ohio in 1865. They had four children:
 Nellie I. (Thorpe) Rowland (1867-1900)
 Clark L. Thorpe (1869-1896)
 Anna A. (Thorpe) Benson (1879-1969)
 Sarah E. (Thorpe) Heald (1881-1954)

References

External links
Freeman Thorpe at AskArt.com
Freeman Woodcock Thorpe on FindAGrave

1844 births
1922 deaths
19th-century American painters
American male painters
20th-century American painters
American portrait painters
People from Geneva, Ohio
Painters from Ohio
19th-century American male artists
20th-century American male artists